Neopectinimura calligina is a moth in the family Lecithoceridae. It is found in Papua New Guinea.

The wingspan is 10–12 mm. The forewing ground color is yellowish-white, speckled with brownish scales. The hindwings are orange gray and slightly broader than the forewings.

Etymology
The species name is derived from the Latin calligin (meaning dark or obscura) and refers to the dark color of the basal part of the antenna.

References

Moths described in 2010
calligina
Insects of Papua New Guinea